Arbacia spatuligera is a species of sea urchin of the family Arbaciidae. Its armour is covered with spines.  A. lixula was first scientifically described in 1846 by Valenciennes.

References 

Arbacioida
Animals described in 1846